Sumanirole (PNU-95,666) is a highly selective D2 receptor full agonist, the first of its kind to be discovered. It was developed for the treatment of Parkinson's disease and restless leg syndrome. While it has never been approved for medical use  it is a highly valuable tool compound for basic research to identify neurobiological mechanisms that are based on a dopamine D2-linked (vs. D1-, D3-, D4-, and D5-linked) mechanism of action.

In 2004, Pfizer announced the end of their clinical development program for sumanirole, citing “recent studies that failed to sufficiently distinguish sumanirole from currently available therapies”.

See also
 Ropinirole

References

Abandoned drugs
Amines
Dopamine agonists
Imidazoquinolines
Ureas